Pouxeux is a commune in the Vosges department in Grand Est in northeastern France.

Inhabitants are called Pexéens.

Geography
Pouxeux lies on the left bank of the Moselle, opposite its confluence with the little river Vologne. Pouxeux station has rail connections to Épinal, Remiremont and Nancy.

History
Before the French Revolution, Pouxeux fell within the territory of Arches, under the bailiwick of Remiremont. Its church, dedicated to Saints Gorgon and Nabor, was an annex to the church at Éloyes. Under the administrative arrangements introduced in 1790 the commune was part of the canton of Éloyes. The present administrative structure came into force some ten years later.

See also
Communes of the Vosges department

References

Communes of Vosges (department)